Nalchik is the capital city of the Kabardino-Balkarian Republic, Russia.

Nalchik may also refer to:
Nalchik Urban Okrug, a municipal formation which the city of republic significance of Nalchik in the Kabardino-Balkarian Republic, Russia is incorporated as
Nalchik Airport, an airport in the Kabardino-Balkarian Republic, Russia
Nalchik River, a river in the Kabardino-Balkarian Republic